William Edmund Smyth (1858–1950) was an Anglican bishop in the last decade of the nineteenth century and the first two of the twentieth.

Biography
He was educated at Eton and King's College, Cambridge. Made a deacon in 1882 at Ely Cathedral and ordained priest in 1883 also at Ely his first posts were curacies at St Mary the Less, Cambridge and St Peter's, London Docks. Next he was chaplain to Douglas MacKenzie, Bishop of Zululand. From 1889 to 1892 he was a Missionary and Theological Tutor at Isandhlwana before elevation to the episcopate as the first Bishop of Lebombo. He was consecrated a bishop on 5 November 1893 in Grahamstown Cathedral, by the Bishops of Cape Town, of Bloemfontein, of Grahamstown, of Pretoria, of St John's, of Kaffraria and of Zululand. Retiring as bishop in 1912, he was warden of the Anglican Hostel at the South African Native College, now the University of Fort Hare until retirement in 1932.

Notes and references

External links

Open Library
St Peter's, London Docks

1858 births
1950 deaths
People educated at Eton College
Alumni of King's College, Cambridge
English Anglican missionaries
Anglican bishops of Lebombo
Anglican missionaries in South Africa